Martín de Andújar Cantos (born 1602 in the Province of Albacete) was a Spanish sculptor and architect. He spent much of his life in Tenerife and is considered one of the island's most noted sculptors. Trained by Juan Martínez Montañés, he himself was a teacher of Blas García Ravelo.

References

1602 births
Year of death missing
People from the Province of Albacete
17th-century Spanish sculptors
Spanish male sculptors
Sculptors from Castilla–La Mancha
Spanish architects